The Gairdner Foundation is a non-profit organization devoted to the recognition of outstanding achievements in biomedical research worldwide. It was created in 1957 by James Arthur Gairdner to recognize and reward the achievements of medical researchers whose work contributes significantly to improving the quality of human life. Since the first awards were made in 1959, the Gairdner Awards have become Canada's most prestigious medical awards, recognizing and celebrating the research of the world’s best and brightest biomedical researchers. 
Since  1959, more than 390 Canada Gairdner Awards have been given to scientists from 35 countries; of these recipients, 95 have subsequently gone on to win a Nobel Prize.

History 

The Gairdner Foundation was created in 1957 by James Arthur Gairdner (1893-1971). Known as Big Jim to his grandchildren, he was, indeed, a larger than life figure. Described by his friends as a talented maverick and visionary, Gairdner was a colorful personality who lived large. He was, by turns, an athlete, a soldier, a stockbroker, a businessman, a philanthropist and a landscape painter. When he died, he left his private estate to the Town of Oakville as an art gallery, which still operates today.

While he had always had an interest in medicine, it was the onset of severe arthritis in his early 50s that led Gairdner to become involved with the newly created Canadian Arthritis and Rheumatism Society. In 1957 he donated $500,000 to establish a foundation to recognize major research contributions in the conquest of disease and human suffering. The Gairdner Foundation was thus born, which was to be his most lasting legacy.

Gairdner’s decision to create awards that recognize outstanding discoveries by the world’s top scientists was, and continues to be, an act of extraordinary vision. Much of his original instruction regarding the process of selection and awarding of the prizes remains in place today, contributing to the current stature of the Canada Gairdner Awards.

Awards
There are three types of awards:
 Canada Gairdner International Awards: given annually to individuals from a diversity of fields for outstanding discoveries or contributions to biomedical science.
Canada Gairdner Global Health Award: recognizes those who have made scientific advances in one of four areas: basic science, clinical science or population or environmental health. The advances must have made, or have the potential to make a significant impact on health in the developing world.
 Canada Gairdner Wightman Award, given to a Canadian who has demonstrated outstanding leadership in medicine and medical science.

Each laureate receives $100,000 CDN that they can put towards anything they wish. Laureates in the past have put their winnings towards their labs, their research or even paid for their niece to attend medical school. The Canada Gairdner Awards are supported by the governments of Canada, Alberta, Quebec and Ontario. In February 2008 the Federal Government announced a $20 million allocation to the Gairdner Foundation to increase the prizes to $100,000 each, and institute a new individual prize in Global Health. Commencing in 2009, the Awards have been renamed the Canada Gairdner International Awards.

Board of directors
A 14-member Board of Directors consisting of three members of the Gairdner family and twelve leading figures in Canadian business and scientific life oversee the work of the Foundation. The Directors provide logistical support to the Medical Review Panel and the Medical Advisory Board, and are also engaged in fundraising for the Foundation and planning for its future growth.

Awards Adjudication Committees
The Gairdner reputation rests squarely on the outstanding quality of its adjudication process. The model for adjudication that James Gairdner outlined in 1959 remains essentially intact.

The nominations for the Canada Gairdner International Awards go through a two-stage adjudication process. The first assessment is done by The Medical Review Panel (MRP), a group of over 30 leading scientists from across Canada. They select a short list of approximately 20 candidates, which is then given to The Medical Advisory Board (MAB), composed of 24 Canadian and international scientists. Each January, the MAB meets in Toronto to review the nominations submitted by the Medical Review Panel. After an in-depth study and lengthy discussion of each nominee, comparing their work with others in their respective field, secret ballots are cast and the five annual winners chosen.

The Canada Gairdner Global Health Award was initiated in 2009 – when Gairdner received a $20 million allocation from the Government of Canada –  and it quickly became the most important award in the field. The winners are selected by the Global Health Advisory Committee, a group of 12 domestic and international scientists. After a comprehensive evaluation process, the committee selects an eventual winner from the pool of submitted nominations through a secret ballot.

The Canada Gairdner Wightman Award recipient is selected by the Wightman Committee, a group of nine recognized leaders in Canadian and international medicine. With careful inquiry and thorough discussion, the Committee chooses the most outstanding candidate by secret ballot.

Student Outreach Program
Along with recognizing the life-changing work of laureates, The Gairdner Foundation also strives to inspire the next generation of students to consider a career in the health sciences through its National Program, which sees current and past awardees travel across to universities across Canada to speak to medical and science faculty. Since 2001, this has also included lecture series aimed specifically at selected senior high school and CEGEP students.

The lectures, which are each 15 to 20 minutes long, provide a chance for accomplished scientists to connect and share their experiences with younger audiences. Laureates discuss their award-winning research as well as the journeys that led them to pursue careers in science, engaging with and encouraging high school students to similarly work towards achieving their own professional goals.

Lectures take place in various towns and cities across the country, including Charlottetown, Kingston, Toronto (at York University and University of Toronto), Ottawa, Montreal, Waterloo, London, Guelph, Winnipeg, Saskatoon, Edmonton, Calgary and Vancouver. At several universities, these lectures have become part of the overall student recruitment program.

For information on 2017 Student Outreach programs, please visit the Foundation's website.

Gairdner National Program
Each October, as part of the Gairdner's mandate to communicate the work of medical researchers to others, the most recent Canada Gairdner awardees, along with awardees from years past, visit universities across Canada to provide academic lectures on their various areas of expertise.

References

External links 
The Gairdner Foundation

Biomedical research foundations
Non-profit organizations based in Ontario
Medical and health organizations based in Ontario
Scientific organizations established in 1957